Antoni Ramallets Simón (1 July 1924 – 30 July 2013) was a Spanish football goalkeeper and manager.

He spent most of his career at FC Barcelona, during the 1950s and early 1960s, winning the Ricardo Zamora Trophy as the best goalkeeper in La Liga on five occasions, and 18 major club honours.

He represented Spain in the 1950 FIFA World Cup and, in the 1960s, managed several clubs in his country, notably winning two major trophies with Real Zaragoza.

Club career
Ramallets signed for FC Barcelona in 1946 at the age of 23, from Real Valladolid, where he also spent his first season after being purchased, on loan. He returned to the club to play second-fiddle to Juan Velasco, making his La Liga debut in a 2–1 win against Sevilla FC, on 28 November 1948. Although this was his only appearance during the season, he eventually became the starter, being an essential defensive unit as his team - then named Club de Fútbol Barcelona - went on to win six leagues and five domestic cups; in the 1951–52 campaign, as Barça won five major trophies, he contributed with 28 league games, being awarded his first Ricardo Zamora Trophy.

During the 1950s, Ramallets was a prominent member of the successful Barcelona side that also included Joan Segarra, Marià Gonzalvo, László Kubala, Sándor Kocsis, Evaristo, Luis Suárez and Zoltán Czibor. During his spell with the club he made 538 appearances, including 288 in the domestic league; on 6 March 1962 the Blaugrana played a testimonial in his honour against Hamburger SV, winning 5–1.

Ramallets coached several teams over the following decade, including old acquaintance Valladolid. In the 1963–64 campaign he led Real Zaragoza to the fourth place in the league, the Spanish Cup and the Inter-Cities Fairs Cup – a competition he had won twice as a player with Barcelona – defeating fellow league team Valencia CF in the latter.

International career
Ramallets played 35 games for Spain during 11 years, making his debut against Chile on 29 June 1950, during the 1950 FIFA World Cup in Brazil. During the tournament he earned the nickname The Cat of Maracanã, helping the nation to the second group stage.

Ramallets also played seven games for the unofficial Catalan national side.

Death
Ramallets died in his Vilafranca del Penedès home near Barcelona, on 31 July 2013. He was 89 years old.

Honours

Player

Club
Barcelona
La Liga: 1947–48, 1948–49, 1951–52, 1952–53, 1958–59, 1959–60
Copa del Generalísimo: 1951, 1952, 1952–53, 1957, 1958–59
Copa Eva Duarte: 1948, 1952, 1953
Inter-Cities Fairs Cup: 1955–58, 1958–60
Latin Cup: 1949, 1952
Small Club World Cup: 1957

Individual
Ricardo Zamora Trophy: 1951–52, 1955–56, 1956–57, 1958–59, 1959–60

Manager
Zaragoza
Copa del Generalísimo: 1963–64
Inter-Cities Fairs Cup: 1963–64

References

External links

1924 births
2013 deaths
Footballers from Barcelona
Spanish footballers
Association football goalkeepers
La Liga players
Segunda División players
Tercera División players
CE Europa footballers
CD San Fernando players
RCD Mallorca players
Real Valladolid players
FC Barcelona players
Spain international footballers
1950 FIFA World Cup players
Catalonia international footballers
Spanish football managers
La Liga managers
Segunda División managers
Real Valladolid managers
Real Zaragoza managers
Real Murcia managers
CD Logroñés managers
Hércules CF managers
Elche CF Ilicitano managers